Korytki may refer to the following places:
Korytki, Łomża County in Podlaskie Voivodeship (north-east Poland)
Korytki, Suwałki County in Podlaskie Voivodeship (north-east Poland)
Korytki, Warmian-Masurian Voivodeship (north Poland)